Bercham Draw is a tributary stream of Animas Creek in Hidalgo County, New Mexico.

References 

Bercham Draw (Animas Creek)
Rivers of New Mexico